Marion Bartoli won the title, defeating Petra Kvitová in the final 6–1, 4–6, 7–5 to win the women's singles tennis title at the 2011 Eastbourne International. Bartoli won the title after saving a match point Lucie Šafářová had against her in the first round. Ekaterina Makarova was the defending champion, but lost to Kvitová in the second round. 

This tournament was notable for being the first in which Serena Williams competed since her victory at the 2010 Wimbledon Championships, after battling a foot injury. She lost in the second round to Vera Zvonareva.

Seeds

Qualifying

Draw

Finals

Top half

Bottom half

References
 Main Draw

Singles
Aegon International - Singles